The western tussock moth, Orgyia vetusta, formerly Hemerocampa vetusta, is a moth found in the Pacific States and British Columbia, as well as an isolated population in Boise County, Idaho. The species is dimorphic; the females are flightless. This species has also been seen in gulf coast states such as Louisiana.

References

USDA Forest Pest Leaflet 120
University of California pest management guidelines for Apple, Apricot, Cherry, Citrus, Pistachio, Plum, and Prune
Stanford University Grounds Services: Evaluating the Effectiveness of Releasing Beneficial Insects to Control Tussock Moth Populations at Stanford University
Note to caterpillars dangling under the oaks: Meet the beetles

Lymantriinae
Moths described in 1852